Caleb Perry Johnson (born April 23, 1991) is an American singer who won the 13th season of American Idol. Prior to appearing on the series, he was the front man for the band Elijah Hooker. After American Idol, Johnson released his debut solo album, Testify, through Interscope Records. After leaving his label, he formed another group, Caleb Johnson and the Ramblin' Saints, and in 2019, the group self-released its first album, Born from Southern Ground.

Early life 
Caleb Johnson was born on April 23, 1991, to David and Tamra Johnson in Asheville, North Carolina. His mother works as an accountant, his father is a former football coach and works for the Parks and Recreation Department of Buncombe County, North Carolina, but both have backgrounds in music. He attended Clyde A. Erwin High School in Asheville and graduated in 2009. He played some sports in high school, joined the drama club and chorus, and did some mission work and some volunteering at his church, Calvary Baptist.

Johnson became interested in singing around age 17 when Josh Sawyer, who had a band in his high school, asked him to be the lead singer. The first song he performed in public in his high school was "Fortunate Son" by Creedence Clearwater Revival. He took part in a talent show while in high school with a band called Gorgon. He considers Chris Cornell to be his biggest musical influence, and that Rush is his favorite band.

Music career

2010: Elijah Hooker 
After graduating Erwin High School in Asheville, North Carolina, on June 30, 2009, Caleb Johnson first joined a band called Rock Bottom as its lead singer. A year later, he joined his friend Josh Sawyer in rock band called Elijah Hooker and became its lead vocalist. Sawyer is the lead guitarist of the band; the other members of the band included Brian Turner on Keyboard, Shawn Foerst on bass, and Colten Emery on drums.

Elijah Hooker released its self-titled debut album Elijah Hooker in June 2013. The 10-track album featured  "Happiest Man" as its lead track.

2011–14: American Idol

Johnson auditioned for American Idol three times in four years.  He first auditioned for the tenth season of American Idol in 2011. He was put through to Hollywood Week and was in a Hollywood group with James Durbin. In 2012, Johnson auditioned for the eleventh season and made it to the Top 42. He had difficulties in his performance of "Old Time Rock and Roll" and was cut at the Top 24 selection. He took the following year off from auditioning to improve on his stage presence.

Johnson auditioned again in 2014 for the thirteenth season and made it to the top 20. In the semi-final round, he was voted by America into the top five male contestants, giving him a spot in the season's top 13. Johnson got positive feedback from the judges every week, had strong performances, and became the only finalist in the season to never land in the bottom 3 prior to reaching the finale. That season, Johnson was declared the winner.

Season 13 of American Idol

2014–present
Soon after Johnson won American Idol he started working on his debut album. The album was recorded in three weeks and Johnson collaborated with musicians such as Howard Benson, Aloe Blacc, Brian Howes, Blair Daly and James Michael. Testify was released on August 12, 2014.

After parting ways with his record label in late 2015, Johnson began working on his second album independently. The album was set to be released in 2016 but failed to. The lead single, "Holding On," was released on February 9, 2016. A second single, "Hanging with the Band," was released on April 7, 2016.

In 2018, Johnson joined Trans-Siberian Orchestra for their winter tour singing on "Three Kings & I."

On June 14, 2019, Johnson released an album, Born from Southern Ground, as Caleb Johnson & The Ramblin Saints. Johnson explained the addition of his backing band on the album: "The Ramblin Saints is my band. We decided to add the band name to my name and that would take it more into that rock direction. We used people like Bob Seeger and the Silver Bullet Band or Tom Petty and the Heartbreakers as a template. The musicians are from Nashville. I have two separate bands a studio band that I use based out of Nashville and my touring band is based out of Asheville." The album was produced by Johnson on his own newly created label, Big Johnson Records.

Johnson's next album, Mountain Mojo Vol. 1, was released on June 18, 2021. The album has contributions from Jason Bonham, Tyler Bryant, Josh Sawyer, Audley Freed, Tony Lucido, Mike Webb, Damon Johnson, Gale Mayes, Devonne Michele, and Angela Primm.

Johnson joined the Neverland Express band of the late American singer Meat Loaf and the late American songwriter Jim Steinman in 2021 and they released Paradise Found: Bat Out Of Hell Reignited released on January 27, 2023 under Deko Entertainment.

Discography

Studio albums
with Elijah Hooker
 Elijah Hooker (2013)

Solo

with Caleb Johnson & The Ramblin' Saints
 Born from Southern Ground (2019)

Singles

Release from "American Idol"
"The Edge of Glory"
"Dazed and Confused"
"Chain of Fools"
"Faithfully"
"Family Tree"
"Sting Me"
"I Don't Want to Miss a Thing"
"Travelin' Band"

Music videos

See also
List of Idols winners

References

External links
Official website

1991 births
21st-century American singers
American Idol winners
American rock singers
American heavy metal singers
Interscope Records artists
Living people
Musicians from Asheville, North Carolina
21st-century American male singers